Scopula ochraceata is a moth of the  family Geometridae. It is found in Bulgaria, North Macedonia, Greece, Turkey, the Near East, southern Russia and Ukraine.

References

Moths described in 1901
ochraceata
Moths of Europe
Moths of Asia